The T90 is a heavy machine gun developed at the 205th Armory of Combined Service Forces, Ministry of Defense, Republic of China (Taiwan). It is intended as a replacement for the M2 heavy machine gun.

References

.50 BMG machine guns
Firearms of the Republic of China